Alfonso de Borbón may refer to several Spanish kings and their relatives:
Alfonso XII of Spain
Alfonso XIII of Spain
Infante Alfonso, Duke of Calabria (1901–1964)
Alfonso, Prince of Asturias (1907–1938)
Alfonso, Duke of Anjou and Cádiz (1936–1989)
Infante Alfonso of Spain (1941–1956)

See also Alfonso de Bourbon.